Mondschein is a surname. Notable people with the surname include:

Brian Mondschein (born 1983), American-born Israeli pole vaulter
Irving Mondschein, American former track and field athlete and football player
Jerzy Mondschein (1909–1944), Polish Air Force officer
Kurt Mondschein,  German footballer
Eric Mondschein Ed.D., (Born 1950), American Author and education consultant

German-language surnames